Kenneth Henry Kirk (February 26, 1938 – November 16, 2009) was an American football linebacker who played college football for Ole Miss and professional football for the Chicago Bears (1960–1961), Pittsburgh Steelers (1962), and Los Angeles Rams (1963).

Early years
A native of Tupelo, Mississippi, he attended Tupelo High School and then played college football for Ole Miss from 1957 to 1959. He was a co-captain of the 1959 Ole Miss Rebels football team that compiled a 10–1 record, gave up only 21 points during the entire season, and was recognized as national champion. He graduated in 1960 with a degree in finance.

Professional football
He was drafted by the Chicago Bears with the 104th pick in the 1960 NFL Draft. He played for the Bears during the 1960 and 1961 seasons, the Pittsburgh Steelers in 1962, and the Los Angeles Rams in 1963. He appeared in a total of 44 NFL games.

Later years
After his football career ended, Kirk worked as a real estate developer, property manager, and construction executive. He died in 2009 at the North Mississippi Medical Center in Tupelo, Mississippi.

References

1938 births
2009 deaths
American football linebackers
Chicago Bears players
Pittsburgh Steelers players
Los Angeles Rams players
Ole Miss Rebels football players
Sportspeople from Tupelo, Mississippi
Players of American football from Mississippi